Caladenia applanata is a species of flowering plant in the orchid family Orchidaceae and is endemic to the south-west of Western Australia. It has a single erect, hairy leaf and up to three flowers. The species was first described in 2001 by Stephen Hopper and Andrew Brown and the description was published in Nuytsia.  In the same paper, Hopper and Brown described two subspecies:
 Caladenia applanata subsp. applanata which has flowers which may be red, cream, green or yellow;
 Caladenia applanata subsp. erubescens which has pink flowers.

References

applanata
Endemic orchids of Australia
Orchids of Western Australia
Plants described in 2001
Taxa named by Stephen Hopper
Taxa named by Andrew Phillip Brown